Louis-François Faur (24 August 1746 – 1829) was a French librettist, playwright and man of letters.

Faur was a secretary of the Duke of Fronsac and, although he left many productions, he ended his days in poverty and oblivion.

Works

Comedies 
1780: le Déguisement forcé, two-act comedy
1784: Isabelle et Fernand ou l’Alcade de Zolaitrée, three-act comedy
1784: l’Amour à l’épreuve
1786: la Veuve anglaise
1801: le Confident par hasard, comedy in 4 acts and in verse
1805: Rien pour lui, three-act comedy, etc.

Dramas 
1783: Montrose et Amélie, qui eut un grand succès
1786: la Prévention vaincue
1795: Alphonsine et Séraphine
1805: le Sabot fidèle

Librettos for opéras comiques 
1786: Colombine et Cassandre le pleureur 
1794: l’Intrigant sans le vouloir 
1796: la Fête de la cinquantaine, in-8°, etc.

The one work of Faur's production which was the most notorious is the Vie privée du maréchal de Richelieu (Paris, 1790, 3 vol. in-8°). It contains interesting anecdotes intended to scandal, including the romantic adventure of Duke de Richelieu, with Mme Michelin, nicknamed la belle tapissière.

Sources 
 .
 Biographie universelle, ancienne et moderne (Supplément), Paris : Louis-Gabriel Michaud, 1838, vol.64,

External links 
 Louis-François Faur on Data.bnf.fr

18th-century French writers
18th-century French male writers
18th-century French dramatists and playwrights
French opera librettists
1746 births
1829 deaths